This is a list of nearby stellar associations and moving groups. A stellar association is a very loose star cluster, looser than an open cluster. A moving group is the remnant of such a stellar association. Members of stellar associations and moving groups share similar kinematic properties, as well as similar ages and chemical composition.

The list is sorted by the distance to the Solar System.

See also 
 List of stellar streams
 List of open clusters
 List of nearest stars and brown dwarfs

References 

 
Stellar associations